You Want It, You Got It is the second studio album by American vocal group, The Detroit Emeralds, released in 1972 through Westbound Records.

Commercial performance
The album peaked at No. 37 on the R&B albums chart. It also reached No. 78 on the Billboard 200. The album features the title track, which peaked at No. 5 on the Hot Soul Singles chart and No. 36 on the Billboard Hot 100, "Baby Let Me Take You (In My Arms)", which charted at No. 4 on the Hot Soul Singles chart and No. 24 on the Billboard Hot 100, and "Feel the Need in Me", which reached No. 22 on the Hot Soul Singles chart.

Track listing

Personnel
Katouzzion – producer
Abrim Tilmon – arranger, conductor 
Johnny Allen – arranger, conductor

Charts
Album

Singles

References

External links

1972 albums
The Detroit Emeralds albums
Westbound Records albums